Picture This Live is a first live album by the band Blondie released by EMI subsidiary Chrysalis Records as a limited edition full-price album in 1997 in the United States. It was later released in the United Kingdom and Europe as a mid-price release with alternate artwork under the title Blondie Live: Philadelphia 1978 / Dallas 1980 in 1999.

As of August 9 2005 it has sold 22,000 copies in United States.

Overview
Picture This Live was released as part of a series of limited edition albums celebrating EMI's 100th anniversary in 1997. The album contains two performances originally recorded for the King Biscuit Flower Hour radio show.

The song "A Shark in Jets Clothing" which is joined with "I Know but I Don't Know" on track 11 is omitted from the track listing of all editions of the album.

Live versions of "I Know but I Don't Know" and "Hanging on the Telephone" from this album were later added as bonus tracks to the 2001 remastered edition of Blondie's 1978 album Parallel Lines. The song "Detroit 442" from the Philadelphia performance is not present on this album, however it was issued as a bonus track on the 2001 remastered edition of Blondie's other 1978 album, Plastic Letters.

Track listing

 Tracks 1-6 and 13-15 recorded live August 5, 1979 in Dallas, Texas (incorrectly listed on the album as 1980, the original radio broadcast date)
 Tracks 7-12 recorded live November 6, 1978 at the Walnut Street Theatre in Philadelphia, Pennsylvania

Personnel

Blondie
 Deborah Harry – vocals
 Chris Stein – guitar
 Clem Burke – drums
 Jimmy Destri – keyboards
 Nigel Harrison – bass guitar
 Frank Infante – guitar

Additional Personnel
 Cheryl Pawelski – Compilation Producer, Producer
 Bernadette Fauver – Producer
 Kevin Flaherty – Associate Producer, Liner Notes
 Marc Rashba – Executive Producer
 Lisa Reddick – Producer
 Adam Varon – Producer
 Ann King Speer – Production Coordination
 Johnny Lee – Art Direction
 Ricky Mintz – Art Direction
 John O'Brien – Design

References

Blondie (band) albums
1998 live albums
1998 compilation albums